is a district located in Rumoi Subprefecture, Hokkaido, Japan. As of 2004, the district has an estimated population of 4,337 and a density of 6.91 persons per km2. The total area is 627.29 km2. Rumoi district is co-extensive with Obira town in land area.

Town
Obira

In July 2004, the city of Rumoi, the town of Obira, and the town of Mashike from Mashike District were supposed to form the South Rumoi Three-Municipality Merger Board, aiming at merging the three, in which case Rumoi and Masahike Districts would cease to exist. However, this has yet to occur.

Districts in Hokkaido